NMPI may refer to:
National Medicaid Pooling Initiative, a prescription drug purchasing pool in the US 
Nissan Motor Philippines, Inc.,an automobile manufacturer
Non-mainstream pooled investment vehicle, a form of investment fund in the UK